Live in Orlando (in Portuguese: Ao Vivo em Orlando) is the second video album by Trazendo a Arca. It was recorded in Orlando, USA in 2011.

Track listing
"Santo" (Holy, Holy, Holy)
"Introdução, instrumental" (Introduction, instrumental)
"Yeshua"
"Sobre a Terra" (About the Earth)
"Grande Deus" (Great God)
"Invoca-me" (Call on Me)
"Serás Sempre Deus" (You will be always God)
"Nosso Deus é Santo" (Our God is Holy)
"Em Ti Esperarei" (In God I will wait)
"Por que Te Abates" (Why grieves)
"Cruz" (Cross)
"Pra Tocar no Manto" (To Touch the mantle)
"Entre a Fé e a Razão" (Between Faith and Reason)
"O Nardo" (The Nardo)
"Casa do Oleiro" (The potter's house)
"Reina o Senhor" (The Lord reigneth)

Personnel
Luiz Arcanjo (lead vocals, guitar)
André Mattos (drums)
Ronald Fonseca (keyboard, piano, produce)
Deco Rodrigues (bass)
Isaac Ramos (electric guitar)

References

Trazendo a Arca albums
2011 live albums
2011 video albums
Live video albums